Church of Sweden in New York (also known as the Swedish Seamen's Church) is a Church of Sweden church at 5 East 48th Street in Midtown Manhattan, New York City. It is a parish of the Church of Sweden Abroad. Dating to 1921, it was placed on the National Register of Historic Places in 2014.

The church is currently open Wednesday to Sunday. As of 2022, Iits café is located in the church's basement while work is undertaken on the building's upper floors. A library and reading room (featuring a memorial plaque to Raoul Wallenberg) is located on the first floor, while the chapel, sacristy and children's room is on the second floor. The chapel's organ dates to 1986, the work of Torshälla's Walter Thür. The uppermost floors are private residences and a rooftop terrace.

Its founding came after around 1.4 million Swedes arrived on American shores between 1820 and 1900. They found solace in these churches, where they could keep up with news from their homeland, collect and send mail and enjoy refreshments.

In 1921, a year after a donation of around $250,000 from Henrietta E. Francis Talcott, the church was rebuilt in a Gothic style. The donor was the wife of farmer-turned-millionaire James Talcott, who died in 1916 at the age of 86. The new building was the work of architect Wilfred E. Anthony (1878–1948). Henrietta died in December 1921, aged 79; it is not known whether she got to see the finished building.

On 31 March 1978, the Church of Sweden Abroad bought the property from the New York Bible Society for $570,000. The air rights were sold in 1981 for $1 million and paid off the debt.

The song "Christmas in New York" was written by Billy Butt on the church's piano in 1979.

See also
National Register of Historic Places listings in Manhattan from 14th to 59th Streets

References

External links

1921 establishments in New York City
20th-century Church of Sweden church buildings
Buildings and structures on the National Register of Historic Places in Manhattan
Churches completed in 1921
Churches in Manhattan
Churches on the National Register of Historic Places in New York (state)
Gothic Revival church buildings in New York City
Midtown Manhattan
Church of Sweden churches